Grayton Beach may refer to:
Grayton Beach, Florida, town in Florida
Grayton Beach State Park, state park in Florida